Fidel de Castro (24 April 1911 – 9 June 2007) was a Filipino film actor. He was born in San Fernando, Pampanga, Philippines and died in Fort Myers Beach, Florida.

He was sometimes credited as Fidel Castro.

Filmography
 1938 - Dugong Hinugasan
 1940 - Alitaptap
 1941 - Paraiso
 1941 - Ikaw Pala
 1946 - Orasang Ginto
 1946 - Garrison 13
 1946 - Ginoong Patay-Gutom
 1946 - Dalawang Daigdig
 1946 - Orasang Ginto

References

External links

1911 births
2007 deaths
People from San Fernando, Pampanga
Male actors from Pampanga
Filipino male film actors